The 1975–76 Scottish Premier Division season was won by Rangers, six points ahead of Celtic. Dundee and St Johnstone were relegated. This was the first season of the Premier Division, the highest level of Scottish football. The Scottish First Division, previously the top flight of Scottish football became the second flight.

In an attempt to bring instant drama to the new format, the league made the unusual scheduling decision to hold an Old Firm match and an Edinburgh Derby on the opening weekend.

Table

Results

Matches 1–18
During matches 1–18 each team plays every other team twice (home and away).

Matches 19–36

References
1975–76 Scottish Premier Division – Statto

Scottish Premier Division seasons
1975–76 Scottish Football League
Scot